Yan Tan Tethera or yan-tan-tethera is a sheep-counting system traditionally used by shepherds in Northern England and some other parts of Britain. The words are numbers taken from Brythonic Celtic languages such as Cumbric which had died out in most of Northern England by the sixth century, but they were commonly used for sheep counting and counting stitches in knitting until the Industrial Revolution, especially in the fells of the Lake District. Though most of these number systems fell out of use by the turn of the 20th century, some are still in use.

Origin and development 

Sheep-counting systems ultimately derive from Brythonic Celtic languages, such as Cumbric; Tim Gay writes: “[Sheep-counting systems from all over the British Isles] all compared very closely to 18th-century Cornish and modern Welsh". It is impossible, given the corrupted form in which they have survived, to be sure of their exact origin. The counting systems have changed considerably over time.  A particularly common tendency is for certain pairs of adjacent numbers to come to resemble each other by rhyme (notably the words for 1 and 2, 3 and 4, 6 and 7, or 8 and 9). Still, multiples of five tend to be fairly conservative; compare bumfit with Welsh pymtheg, in contrast with standard English fifteen.

Use in sheep counting 
Like most Celtic numbering systems, they tend to be vigesimal (based on the number twenty), but they usually lack words to describe quantities larger than twenty; though this is not a limitation of either modernised decimal Celtic counting systems or the older ones. To count a large number of sheep, a shepherd would repeatedly count to twenty, placing a mark on the ground, or move his hand to another mark on his crook, or drop a pebble into his pocket to represent each score (e.g. 5 score sheep = 100 sheep).

Importance of keeping count 
In order to keep accurate records (e.g. of birth and death) and to be alert to instances of straying, shepherds must perform frequent head-counts of their flocks. Dating back at least to the medieval period, and continuing to the present in some areas like Slaidburn, farms were granted fell rights, allowing them access to common grazing land. To prevent overgrazing, it was vitally important for each farm to keep accurate, updated head-counts. Though fell rights are largely obsolete in modern agriculture except in upland areas, farms are often subsidised and taxed according to the quantity of their sheep. For this reason, accurate counts are still necessary, and must be performed frequently.

Generally, a count is the first action performed in the morning and the last action performed at night. A count is made after moving the sheep from one pasture to another, and after any operation involving the sheep, such as shearing, tagging, foot-trimming, mulesing, etc., although sheep are far less likely to stray while being moved in a group rather than when grazing at large on open ground.

Knitting 
Their use is also attested in a "knitting song" known to be sung around the middle of the nineteenth century in Wensleydale, Yorkshire, beginning "yahn, tayhn, tether, mether, mimph".

Modern usage 
The counting system has been used for products sold within Northern England, such as prints, beers, hard seltzer, and yarns, as well as artistic works referencing the region such as Harrison Birtwistle's 1986 opera Yan Tan Tethera.

Jake Thackray's song "Old Molly Metcalfe" from his 1972 album Bantam Cock uses the Swaledale "Yan Tan Teher Mether Pip" as a repeating lyrical theme.

"Yan" or "yen" 
The word yan or yen for "one" in Cumbrian, Northumbrian, and some Yorkshire dialects generally represents a regular development in Northern English in which the Old English long vowel  <ā> was broken into /ie/, /ia/ and so on. This explains the shift to yan and ane from the Old English ān, which is itself derived from the Proto-Germanic *ainaz. Another example of this development is the Northern English word for "home", hame, which has forms such as hyem, yem and yam all deriving from the Old English hām.

Systems by region

Yorkshire and Lancashire

Lincolnshire, Derbyshire and County Durham

Southwest England

Cumberland, and Westmorland

Wilts, Scots, Lakes, Dales and Welsh 
Note: Scots here means "Scots" not "Gaelic"

Numerals in Brythonic Celtic languages

See also
 Counting-out game

References

Further reading
Rawnsley, Hardwicke Drummmond (1987) "Yan tyan tethera: counting sheep". Woolley: Fleece Press

External links 
 Breton numerals
  Carol Justus's use of this numbering system to explain pre-decimal counting systems
 The Sheep Counting Score – By Walter Skeat, 1910
 Modern Welsh decimal system and older vigesimal system in full

Sheep farming in the United Kingdom
Languages of the United Kingdom
British English
Celtic words and phrases
English words and phrases
Numeral systems